Gary Comer College Prep Middle School is a Level 1 public three-year charter middle school located in the Grand Crossing neighborhood in Chicago, Illinois. It is a part of the Noble Network of Charter Schools. Gary Comer College Prep Middle School is the only middle school campus of the Noble Network of Charter Schools in Chicago, IL. Named after the late Gary Comer, the middle school shares a building with Paul Revere Elementary School in the Greater Grand Crossing neighborhood.

References

External links
Noble Network of Charter Schools

2011 establishments in Illinois
Noble Network of Charter Schools
Educational institutions established in 2011
Public middle schools in Chicago